Jesselton Freemason Hall (also called as Lodge Kinabalu) in present-day Kota Kinabalu, Sabah Malaysia is the meeting place for the Masonic lodges in the former Jesselton area. It was opened since 1951 during British Crown rule.

History 

Since the 1880s, there has been plans to establish Masonic lodge in the British Borneo area. On 26 January 1951, Freemasonry established its firm roots in the Crown Colony of North Borneo with the Consecration of Lodge Kinabalu. A move was then made in 1960 to form a Royal Arch Chapter under the Scottish Constitution in Jesselton, to be supported by Jesselton Lodge, Elopura Lodge and Brunei Lodge which culminating in the inaugural meeting of Northern Borneo Royal Arch Chapter on 19 January 1962 in the town.

See also 
 Freemasonry in Asia

References

External links 

Buildings and structures in Sabah
Masonic buildings in Malaysia
Masonic buildings completed in 1951
20th-century architecture in Malaysia